Beesley is a surname. Notable people with the surname include:

 Alfred Beesley, English topographer and poet
 Bradley Beesley, American independent filmmaker
 Colin Beesley, English footballer
 Damon Beesley, English writer and television producer
 Ebenezer Beesley, Latter-day Saint hymn writer and composer
 George Beesley, English Catholic priest and martyr
 Jake Beesley, English footballer
 John Alan Beesley, Canadian civil servant and diplomat
 Lawrence Beesley, English science teacher, journalist and author
 Mark Beesley, English footballer
 Matt Beesley, English rugby union player
 Matt Earl Beesley, American film director and television director
 Max Beesley, English actor and musician
 Meghan Beesley, British athlete
 Michael Beesley, British industrial economist and  politician
 Mike Beesley, English footballer
 Paul Beesley, English footballer
 Shayla Beesley, American actress
 Terence Beesley (1957–2017), English actor
 William Beesley, English recipient of the Victoria Cross

See also
 Beasley (surname)
 Beazley
 Beesly

English toponymic surnames